Datian railway station is a freight station of Guangzhou-Zhuhai Railway located at Datian Village, Jianggao Town, Baiyun District, Guangzhou, Guangdong, China. It started operations in 2009.

References

Baiyun District, Guangzhou
Railway stations in Guangzhou
Railway stations in China opened in 2009